Hate Campaign is the fifth studio album by Dismember.

Track listing

Personnel
 Fred Estby - Drums
 Matti Kärki - Vocals
 David Blomqvist - Guitars 
 Sharlee D'Angelo - Bass
 Magnus Sahlgren - Guitar

Dismember (band) albums
2000 albums
Nuclear Blast albums